The Wabigalo–Nakasongola–Sasira Road is a road in the Central Region of Uganda, connecting the town of Nakasongola with the towns of Wabigalo and Sasira on the Kampala–Gulu Highway. An extension from Nakasongola links to Nakasongola Air Force Base.

Location
The geographical coordinates of this road, between Wabigalo and Nakasongola are: 01°18'54.0"N, 32°26'26.0"E (Latitude:1.315000; Longitude:32.440556).

Overview
This road connects the town of Nakasongola, where the headquarters of Nakasongola District are located, to the Gulu Highway, which links the capital Kampala, to Gulu, the largest city in the Northern Region of Uganda. It also links downtown Nakasongola to Nakasongola Air Force Base and Nakasongola Military Airport.

Upgrading to tarmac
Prior to 2010, this road was gravel-surface in poor condition, with gullies and pot-holes. The upgrading of the road involved the conversion of the then existing gravel surface to  tarmac and the building of bridges and drainage channels. Energo Project, a Serbian construction company carried out the upgrade, between 2010 and 2011, at a cost of USh13.8 billion (at that time US$6 million), funded by the Government of Uganda.

See also
 Nakasongola District
 Economy of Uganda
 List of cities and towns in Uganda
 List of roads in Uganda

References

External links
 Bus accident claims four and leaves 28 injured
 Nakasongola: A Climate Change Hot Spot As of 14 June 2016.

Roads in Uganda
Central Region, Uganda
Nakasongola District
Transport infrastructure in Uganda